A sense in biology and psychology, is a physiological mechanism that supports perception.

Sense also may refer to:

Music
 Sense (band), a synthpop trio featuring Paul K. Joyce
 Sense (In the Nursery album), 1991
 Sense (Mr. Children album), 2010
 Sense (The Lightning Seeds album), 1992
 "Sense" (song), 2021 song by Band-Maid
 "Sense", 2018 song by Last Dinosaurs from Yumeno Garden
 "Sense", 1992 song by The Lightning Seeds from Sense
 "Sense", 1994 song by Terry Hall from Home
 "Sense", 2013 song by Tom Odell from Long Way Down
 "Senses", 1981 song by New Order from Movement
 "Senses", 1970 song by Willie Nelson from Laying My Burdens Down
 "The Sense", 2002 song by Hot Water Music from Caution

Other
 Sense (electronics), a technique used in power supplies to produce the correct voltage for a load
 Sense (molecular biology), the roles of nucleic-acid molecules in specifying amino acids
 Sense (programming), an educational programming environment
 Sense (river), a tributary of the River Saane in Switzerland
 Sense Worldwide, a London-based co-creation consulting company
 HTC Sense, a mobile software suite developed by HTC
 Senses (tribe), a Dacian tribe

See also 
 Common sense, sound practical judgment concerning everyday matters
 Sense and reference, philosophical distinction introduced by Gottlob Frege
 Sensor, a mechanism to detect events or changes in its environment
 Word sense, the meaning carried by a word
 Sensory (disambiguation)